The Hookeriaceae are a family of mainly tropical mosses of the order Hookeriales. 

It contains six genera from the UK.

Genera
As accepted by GBIF;

 Achrophyllum  (8)
 Adelothecium  (1)
 Archephemeropsis  (1)
 Bryobrothera  (1)
 Callicostella  (128)
 Calyptrochaeta  (33)
 Canalohypopterygium  (1)
 Chaetomitriopsis (1)
 Crosbya  (2)
 Curviramea (1)
 Cyathophorella  (18)
 Cyclodictyon  (117)
 Dendrocyathophorum  (2)
 Dimorphocladon (2)
 Diploneuron  (2)
 Discophyllum (2)
 Distichophyllum (138)
 Elharveya (1)
 Ephemeropsis  (2)
 Eriopus  (27)
 Hampeohypnum (1)
 Harpophyllum (1)
 Hemiragis  (1)
 Holoblepharum  (4)
 Hookeria  (164)
 Hookeriopsis  (105)
 Lamprophyllum (2)
 Lepidopilidium  (33)
 Lopidium  (15)
 Metadistichophyllum  (1)
 Philophyllum  (1)
 Piloseriopus  (1)
 Pilosium (1)
 Pilotrichidium  (4)
 Pterygophyllum  (47)
 Rhynchostegiopsis  (9)
 Sauloma  (8)
 Schimperobryum  (1)
 Schizomitrium  (49)
 Sclerohypnum (1)
 Stenodictyon  (6)
 Tetrastichium  (2)
 Thamniopsis  (25)
 Trachyxiphium  (14)
 Vesiculariopsis  (1)

Note; numbers in the parenthis equate to number of species per genus

References

External links

Hookeriales
Moss families
Taxa named by James Edward Smith